Reunion Road Trip is a docuseries on the E! network, documenting the reunions of several casts from different television shows as they reconnect and reflect on their iconic series that helped shape the television landscape.

The Jersey Shore reunion served as the pilot episode, premiering on August 20, 2017.

After 4 years in development hell, the show was announced to return as a four-episode event series on June 10, 2021. Amongst those reuniting are the casts of All My Children, the original Queer Eye for the Straight Guy, A Different World, and Scrubs.

References

2010s American documentary television series
2017 American television series debuts